Bobkovo is a rural locality (a selo) and the administrative center of Bobkovsky Selsoviet, Rubtsovsky District, Altai Krai, Russia. The population was 911 as of 2013. There are 15 streets.

Geography 
Bobkovo is located 29 km northeast of Rubtsovsk (the district's administrative centre) by road. Katkovo is the nearest rural locality.

References 

Rural localities in Rubtsovsky District